Panic Broadcast may refer to:

The War of the Worlds (radio drama)
The Panic Broadcast, a 2010 album by Soilwork